William Henry Wakefield (20 May 1870 – 7 August 1922) was an English first-class cricketer.

The son of William Henry Wakefield of Sedgwick House and his wife, Augusta Hagarty, he was born at Kendal in May 1870. He was educated at Charterhouse School, before going up to the University of Oxford. While at Oxford, he played rugby union for Oxford University. He toured the West Indies with R. S. Lucas' XI in 1894–95, making his debut in first-class cricket on the tour against Barbados at Bridgetown. He made five further first-class appearances on the tour, scoring 30 runs with a high score of 16. Playing as the touring party's wicket-keeper, Wakefield also took 10 catches and made 5 stumpings. Two years later he again toured the West Indies, this time with Lord Hawke's XI, with Wakefield making seven first-class appearances on the tour. He scored 45 runs on the tour, with a high score of 19 not out. As the team's wicket-keeper, he took 8 catches and made a single stumping. He died at Chesham in August 1922.

References

External links

1870 births
1922 deaths
Sportspeople from Kendal
Cricketers from Cumbria
People educated at Charterhouse School
Alumni of the University of Oxford
Oxford University RFC players
English cricketers
R. S. Lucas' XI cricketers
Lord Hawke's XI cricketers